The men's individual skating event was held as part of the figure skating at the 1936 Winter Olympics. It was the sixth appearance of the event, which had previously been held twice at the Summer Olympics in 1908 and 1920 and at all three Winter Games from 1924 onward. The competition was held from Sunday, 9 February to Friday, 14 February 1936. Twenty-five figure skaters from twelve nations competed.

Results
Karl Schäfer successfully defended his 1932 title.

Referee:
  Ulrich Salchow

Judges:
  Charles M. Rotch
  W. Ros Sharpe
  Walter Jakobsson
  John Z. Machado (CF only)
  Fritz Schober (FS only)
  Rudolf Kaler
  László von Orbán
  Jiří Sýkora

References

External links
 Official Olympic Report
 sports-reference
 

Figure skating at the 1936 Winter Olympics
1936 in figure skating
Men's events at the 1936 Winter Olympics